"Good Vibrations" is a 1966 song by the Beach Boys that was written by Brian Wilson and Mike Love.

Good Vibration(s) may also refer to:

Music
 Good Vibrations (musical), a 2005 stage show
 Good Vibrations (record label), established in Northern Ireland in the 1970s

Albums and songs
 Good Vibrations – Best of The Beach Boys, 1975
 Good Vibrations: Thirty Years of The Beach Boys, 1993
 Good Vibrations (Party Animals album), 1996
 Good Vibrations, a 1970 Beach Boys greatest hits compilation
 "Good Vibrations" (Marky Mark and the Funky Bunch song), 1991

Books
 Good Vibrations: My Life as a Beach Boy, 2016 autobiography by Mike Love
 Good Vibrations: My Autobiography, by percussionist Evelyn Glennie

Other
 Good Vibrations (film), a 2013 film about the foundation of the record label
 Good Vibrations (sex shop), a sex-toy business operating from San Francisco since 1977
 Good Vibrations (miniseries), a 1992 Australian miniseries

See also
 Good Vibes (disambiguation)
 Pocket symphony